Mari Indus railway station is located in Mari Indus, Pakistan. It was opened in 1918.

Train routes
The following trains stop/terminate/originate from Mari Indus station:

See also
 List of railway stations in Pakistan
 Pakistan Railways

References

External links

Railway stations in Mianwali District
Railway stations on Daud Khel–Lakki Marwat Branch Line
Railway stations on Kotri–Attock Railway Line (ML 2)
Railway stations opened in 1918
1918 establishments in British India